Robert Martin (born December 8, 1962) is a television and musical theatre actor and writer from Toronto, Ontario, Canada.

Career

Theatre
Martin began his career as an actor and director at The Second City in Toronto in 1996. He served as Second City Toronto's artistic director from 2003–2004.

In 2005, he made his Broadway debut starring as “Man in Chair” in the musical The Drowsy Chaperone, which he co-wrote with Don McKellar (book), and Lisa Lambert and Greg Morrison (music and lyrics). He was nominated for the Tony Award for Best Actor in a Musical and won the Tony Award for Best Book of a Musical with Don McKellar. He reprised his role in London's West End production of The Drowsy Chaperone, for which he received an Olivier nomination. Martin then kicked off the show's North American tour on its first stop in Toronto.

Martin wrote the book for the musical Minsky's, which premiered at the Ahmanson Theater in Los Angeles in 2009.

He returned to Broadway as co-bookwriter of Elf with Thomas Meehan, lyrics by Chad Beguelin and music by Matthew Sklar. Elf had two limited engagements for the holiday seasons of 2010 and 2012.

Martin wrote the book for a musical adaptation of the 1973 film The Sting, with music and lyrics by Mark Hollmann, lyrics by Greg Kotis, and direction by John Rando, who had previously collaborated on Urinetown. Additional music and lyrics were provided by the show's star Harry Connick, Jr. The Sting premiered at Paper Mill Playhouse in Millburn, NJ.

He collaborated with Beguelin and Sklar again for Half Time at Paper Mill Playhouse, which had premiered in Chicago in 2015 under the title Gotta Dance.

Martin reunited once more with the team of Sklar, Beguelin, and director Casey Nicholaw on The Prom which has its world-premiere at the Alliance Theatre in Atlanta in 2016. The Prom opened on Broadway at the Longacre Theatre on November 11, 2018. The Prom received seven Tony nominations including Best Musical and Best Book of a Musical for Martin and Beguelin.

In 2020, Netflix released a film adaptation of The Prom, which was directed by Ryan Murphy and starred Meryl Streep, James Corden, Nicole Kidman, Andrew Rannells, and Keegan-Michael Key. 

Martin is currently writing the book for a musical adaptation of The Princess Bride with Rick Elice, a sequel to The Drowsy Chaperone, a musical adaptation of Night at the Museum with Shawn Levy, and an adaptation of Millions with a score by Adam Guettel.

Television
Martin co-created the award-winning series Slings & Arrows (TMN/Sundance), a TV show about a Canadian theatre company struggling to survive while a crazy genius director haunted by his dead mentor helps the actors find authenticity in their acting. Martin also served as a writer (alongside fellow writers and co-creators Susan Coyne and Mark McKinney) and a creative producer. Martin played the role of Terry in two episodes.

His first foray into writing for television was for the CBC Television series The Industry (formerly titled Made in Canada), in which he also acted.

Martin was also a writer of and starred in the Canadian television sitcom Michael: Tuesdays and Thursdays, which had its debut on CBC Television in fall 2011.

He provided the voice of Cuddles the comfort doll on the Canadian TV show Puppets Who Kill, aired on The Comedy Network.

Martin's improv background carried over to television with acting credits including Improv Heaven and Hell and The Second City Project. For the latter, Martin also served as writer and producer.

Personal life 
Martin is married to Canadian actress Janet van de Graaf.

Works

Film and television works

Theatre works
The Drowsy Chaperone (2006, Marquis Theater, Broadway) – Music and lyrics by Lisa Lambert and Greg Morrison; book by Martin and Don McKellar; directed by Casey Nicholaw
Minsky's (2009, Ahmanson Theater, Los Angeles) – Music by Charles Strouse; lyrics by Susan Birkenhead; book by Martin; directed by Casey Nicholaw
Elf: The Musical (2010, Al Hirschfeld Theatre, Broadway; 2012, Al Hirschfeld Theatre, Broadway) – Music by Matthew Sklar; lyrics by Chad Beguelin; book by Martin and Thomas Meehan; directed by Casey Nicholaw
Half Time (previously titled Gotta Dance) (2015, Bank of America Theater, Chicago; 2018, Paper Mill Playhouse, New Jersey) – Music by Matthew Sklar; lyrics by Nell Benjamin; book by Martin and Chad Beguelin; directed by Jerry Mitchell
The Prom (2016, Alliance Theatre, Atlanta; 2018, Longacre Theatre, Broadway) – Music by Matthew Sklar; lyrics by Chad Beguelin; book by Martin and Beguelin; directed by Casey Nicholaw
The Sting (2018, Paper Mill Playhouse, New Jersey) – Music and lyrics by Mark Hollmann, Greg Kotis, and Harry Connick Jr.; book by Martin; directed by John Rando

Awards and nominations

Recurring collaborators 
Martin's theatrical works are often directed and choreographed by Casey Nicholaw. He often partners with the music and lyrics team of Chad Beguelin and Matthew Sklar, sometimes co-writing the book with Beguelin. Each of Martin's three musicals that have premiered on Broadway have included Beth Leavel in the cast. He has collaborated with Don McKellar, Mark McKinney, and Susan Coyne on Slings & Arrows and Michael: Every Day, and with McKellar on The Drowsy Chaperone.

References

External links 
 
 
Bob Martin - Downstage Center XM radio interview at American Theatre Wing.org, June 2006
New York Magazine interview, May 28, 2006

Canadian sketch comedians
1962 births
Living people
Canadian male film actors
Canadian television writers
Canadian male musical theatre actors
Canadian male television actors
Canadian male voice actors
Canadian librettists
Canadian male television writers
Theatre World Award winners
Canadian Comedy Award winners